The 2012 Superstars Series Hungaroring round was the fifth round of the 2012 Superstars Series season. It took place on 1 July at the Hungaroring.

Vitantonio Liuzzi won the first race, starting from pole position, driving a Mercedes C63 AMG, and Christian Klien gained the second one, driving a Maserati Quattroporte.

Classification

Qualifying

Notes:
  – Massimo Pigoli and Andrea Larini were given a two-place grid penalty for causing a collision with Johnny Herbert in the Mugello round.

Race 1

Race 2

Notes:
  – Thomas Biagi was given an 8-second penalty for causing a collision with Vitantonio Liuzzi.
  – Camilo Zurcher was given a 30-second penalty for causing a collision with Domenico Ferlito.

Standings after the event

International Series standings

Teams' Championship standings

 Note: Only the top five positions are included for both sets of drivers' standings.

References

Superstars
Superstars Series seasons